Dominic Bernard Patrick Luke Monaghan (born 8 December 1976) is a British actor. He is best known for playing Meriadoc "Merry" Brandybuck in Peter Jackson's film trilogy The Lord of the Rings (2001–2003), and Charlie Pace on J. J. Abrams' television show Lost (2004–2010).

Monaghan first gained fame as Hetty Wainthropp's sidekick Geoffrey in Hetty Wainthropp Investigates (1996–1998). His first film role was as Sasha in the television film Hostile Waters (1997) based on the true story of a Soviet and an American submarine colliding in the Cold War. His other film roles include playing the young mutant Chris Bradley formerly known as Maverick in the superhero film X-Men Origins: Wolverine (2009) and playing Beaumont Kin in Star Wars: The Rise of Skywalker (2019), reuniting with J.J. Abrams, the co-creator of Lost. He also has hosted the nature programme Wild Things with Dominic Monaghan (2012–2016).

Early life
Monaghan was born in West Berlin, West Germany, to British parents: Maureen, a nurse, and Austin Monaghan, who was of Irish descent, a science teacher. His older brother Matthew is the main songwriter and co-lead vocalist of the indie band Radiosepia and is a science teacher. Monaghan's family lived in Berlin, Düsseldorf, Stuttgart and Münster, moving about every four years. When he was about 11 years old, his family moved from Germany to Heaton Moor in Stockport, England. In Stockport, he attended St Anne's Roman Catholic High School (where his uncle taught and later became head teacher) and Aquinas College, where he studied English literature, drama and geography.

Career
Although Monaghan held many occupations when he was younger, he always wanted to be an actor. After his second year at St. Anne's, Monaghan became a regular in school plays such as Oliver Twist, A Christmas Carol and Bugsy Malone before joining the Manchester Youth Theatre. There, he was scouted for Hetty Wainthropp Investigates, in which he starred alongside Patricia Routledge and Derek Benfield as Hetty's under-aged sidekick, Geoffrey Shawcross, for four series. Monaghan has since credited Routledge as "an amazing teacher" who taught him some "very valuable lessons" that have influenced his acting career. He made his feature-film debut as Russian sailor Sasha in the TV film Hostile Waters.

Monaghan later starred in The Lord of the Rings film trilogy as Meriadoc Brandybuck, for which he achieved international acclaim and success. Monaghan narrated Ringers: Lord of the Fans, a documentary about The Lord of the Rings fandom. He also provided the narration for The Discovery Channel's documentary Devil's Bible in 2008. He also appeared in Soldiers of Fortune alongside Sean Bean and Christian Slater. 
He was a regular cast member on the ABC series Lost from 2004 to 2007, playing English ex-rockstar and drug addict Charlie Pace. Monaghan originally auditioned for the role of Sawyer. The role of Charlie was then changed from an old, washed up rocker from the 1980s, to a young one-hit wonder to accommodate Monaghan's age. Monaghan returned to the series as a special guest star after departing from the main cast.

In 2009, Monaghan starred as Chris Bradley / Bolt in X-Men Origins: Wolverine. On 15 July 2009, it was confirmed that he would join the cast of ABC Studios' science fiction television series FlashForward as the character Simon. The series premiered on 24 September 2009. It was cancelled after its first season.

On 18 March 2010, Monaghan was spotted at the Universal Sheraton filming a short called Gloria. It was part of a programme called REESES Puff's Extraordinary Cinema (where the teens replace the pros). He played the part of Caleb Reese.

In 2010, Monaghan and Megan Fox made an appearance as a couple in an abusive relationship in the music video for rapper Eminem's song "Love the Way You Lie". Scenes include the celebrities on top of a liquor store. Fox and Monaghan also filmed inside the store and "at a seedy dive bar next door" to the store.

In November 2012, a new show on Channel 5 titled Wild Things with Dominic Monaghan began airing in the UK. The documentary shows Monaghan travelling to various locations such as Venezuela and Ecuador to film and interact with the exotic and often dangerous local wildlife.

During the summer of 2013, Monaghan appeared in several live-action teasers for 2K Marin's science fiction video game "The Bureau: XCOM Declassified".

Monaghan is a fan of The Gaffer Tapes: Fantasy Football Podcast and has appeared as a guest in both April and November 2016 and May 2018, as well as submitting several audio questions which are played on the podcast. While appearing as a guest, Monaghan stated "It's the best fantasy football podcast out there".

Monaghan is a contributing writer for the music and culture magazine Paste, primarily writing articles about Premier League football.

Monaghan is the voice of Sightseeing Manchester's bus tour, recorded in March 2016.

Since August 2018, he has been starring as a serial killer in Channel 9 Australia's Murder Mystery Drama show Bite Club, which is filmed in and around Sydney.

He was named as part of the cast for the last film in the sequel trilogy which is Star Wars: The Rise of Skywalker, reuniting with J.J. Abrams, the co-creator of Lost. He appeared as Beaumont.

In May 2020, Monaghan joined together with fellow Lord of the Rings castmates Sean Astin, Sean Bean, Orlando Bloom, Billy Boyd, Ian McKellen, Viggo Mortensen, Miranda Otto, John Rhys-Davies, Andy Serkis, Liv Tyler, Karl Urban, and Elijah Wood, plus writer Philippa Boyens and director Peter Jackson, to appear on Josh Gad's YouTube series Reunited Apart, which reunites the cast of popular movies through video-conferencing, and promotes donations to non-profit charities. Monaghan and castmate Billy Boyd started the podcast The Friendship Onion where they talk about their time filming The Lord of the Rings.

Personal life
Monaghan is a nature lover and has been active in the planting of trees and cacti. He bought a mango-tree forest in India. Monaghan has a great love for insects and reptiles that he developed during his childhood, and has kept an exotic assortment of pets, including a leaf-mantis named Gizmo, a black widow spider named Witchitar and an albino snake named Blink. The newly discovered species of spider Ctenus monaghani (:de:Ctenus monaghani) is named after him.

An avid outdoorsman, Monaghan enjoys activities such as surfing, kayaking, snowboarding, football, basketball and hiking. He has also stated that he likes hunting for insects and reptiles outdoors. He learned karate as a child, used to practise yoga and often goes to the gym for strength and weight training. He is a longtime fan of hometown English Premier League football team Manchester United since his childhood.

Monaghan loves to play various games and has hosted game nights for fellow cast members in the past, and is also fond of The New York Times crossword puzzle. He enjoys playing League of Legends with fellow Lord of the Rings cast member Billy Boyd. Although English is his first language and the language of his higher education, he is fluent in German as well.

On his right arm he has a tattoo of the English word "nine" written in the artificial script of Tengwar, a reference to his involvement in The Lord of the Rings and the fact that his character was one of the nine members of the Fellowship of the Ring. Seven other cast members and John Rhys-Davies' stunt double also got matching tattoos during the film's production, at Monaghan's instigation. Below that tattoo is another that reads, "Life imitates art", an Oscar Wilde quote. On his left arm is a tattoo, "Living is easy with eyes closed", a line from The Beatles' "Strawberry Fields Forever". He also has two stars tattooed on his left foot: one black, and one white. In 2010, Monaghan got two more tattoos, one on the upper side of the back ("Love you take is equal to the love you make", taken from the song "The End" by The Beatles). The other, done by Kat Von D on the television show LA Ink, is located on his lower right arm and reads "Luminous beings are we, not this crude matter", a quote from Yoda.

He resides in Los Angeles, California. In 2008, Monaghan held a photographic exhibition in Los Angeles in which he sold prints of his own works. A portion of the proceeds from the exhibition were given to an orangutan rescue organisation.

Monaghan was in a relationship with his Lost co-star Evangeline Lilly from 2004 to 2007.

In June 2008, Monaghan travelled to Argentina with Lilly to film the pilot of the American version of CQC.

Monaghan provided the inspiration for the naming of Billy Boyd's band Beecake after he sent his friend a picture of a cake covered in bees.

Filmography

Films

Television

Music videos

Video games

References

External links
 
 Dominic Monaghan interview 

Living people
20th-century British male actors
21st-century British male actors
Actors from Stockport
British expatriates in the United States
British male film actors
British male television actors
British people of Irish descent
German male film actors
German male television actors
German people of Irish descent
Male actors from Berlin
Outstanding Performance by a Cast in a Motion Picture Screen Actors Guild Award winners
1976 births